Enigma is a 2009 science-fiction short film. It is written and directed by the Shumway Brothers.

Cast
 Nadia Salamanca as Kyleigh Rothman
 Ventura Alvarez as Capt. Nathanial J. Rhys
 Iris Corliss as Eidolon
 Cory Rouse as Charles Wyeth
 D. Grigsby Poland as General Rothman
 Nathan Mobley as Lieutenant
 Rachel Riley as Gatekeeper
 Regina Palian as Lead Scientist
 Harry Williams Jr as Security Guard
 Brian DeCato as Security Guard

Production
Enigma was a pet project of the Shumway Brothers for five years.  The project started with an idea to collaborate on a film.  Jason being from the live action world and Matt from the animation world provided an opportunity to bring something unique to the independent film world.  Since they both have a love of sci-fi, this turned out to be the perfect genre for them to create their first film together. Jason and Matt spent six months developing the script and pre-producing the film. Principal photography went over the course of six days, with two rounds of weekend pickups. Post production comprised the majority of the process, taking a little over four years to complete. With the tremendous amount of complex visual effects and having to hold down busy full-time jobs, the post production process was often a difficult task to juggle. Working long hours into the nights and sacrificing weekends provided the time to create the world of Enigma.  Shumway Brothers are noted as excited to share their creation with the world.  They reportedly  received a standing ovation at the Hollywood Premiere. The Shumway Brothers are noted as "happy to see the long hours and several years of work be reflected with smiles and cheers."

Festivals
 Tri-City Independent Film Festival: Oct 2010
 Telluride Horror Show: Oct 2010
 Burbank International Film Festival: Sept 2010
 Cannes Independent Film Festival: May 2010
 Indie Spirit Film Festival: April 2010
 Beverly Hills Shorts Festival: March 2010
 Athens International Sci-Fi & Fantasy Film Festival: March 2010 (European Premiere)
 Boston Science Fiction Film Festival: Feb 2010
 Los Angeles Reel Film Festival Dec: 2009
 Maverick Movie Awards: Dec 2009
 Nevada Film Festival: Nov 2009
 Orlando Film Festival: Nov 2009
 Gig Harbor Film Festival: Oct 2009
 IndieFest! Film Festival: Oct 2009
 ShriekFest Horror and Scifi Film Festival: Oct 2009
 Valley Film Festival: Oct 2009
 SkyFest Film and Script Festival: Sept 2009
 ShockerFest International Film Festival: Sept 2009
 Maelstrom International Fantastic Film Festival:  Sept 2009
 Cinema City International Film Festival: Sept 2009
 DragonCon Independent Film Festival: Sept 2009
 Action on Film International Film Festival: July 2009
 Dances With Films Independent Film Festival: June 2009  (World Premiere)

Awards
 Won Best Sci-fi at the Burbank International Film Festival
 Won Best Sci-fi at the Beverly Hills Shorts Festival
 Won Best Special FX at the Beverly Hills Shorts Festival
 Won Best Sound at the Beverly Hills Shorts Festival
 Won Special Achievement at the Boston Science Fiction Film Festival
 Won Best Special Effects at the Los Angeles Reel Film Festival
 Won Best Stunts at the Los Angeles Reel Film Festival
 Won Best Costume Design at the Los Angeles Reel Film Festival
 Won 2nd Place Best Short at the Los Angeles Reel Film Festival
 Won Best Special Effects at the Maverick Movie Awards
 Won Best Production Design at the Maverick Movie Awards
 Won Special Jury Award at the Nevada Film Festival
 Won Best Short at the Orlando Film Festival
 Won Filmmaker Spirit Award at the Gig Harbor Film Festival
 Won Best Sci-Fi Short at ShriekFest
 Won Audience Choice Best Sci-Fi Short  at the Valley Film Festival
 Won Audience Choice Best Sci-Fi Feature at the Cinema City International Film Festival
 Won Best Science Fiction at the SkyFest Film and Script Festival
 Won Best Science Fiction at the Dragon*Con Independent Film Festival
 Won Best Costumes at the Action On Film International Film Festival
 Won the Audience Award for Best Short at its Film Festival Debut as part of Dances with Films in Hollywood, CA.

External links
 
 

2009 films
2009 science fiction films
American science fiction short films
2009 short films
2000s English-language films
2000s American films